When You Were Mine is the sixth studio album by English singer and musician John Waite, released by Mercury/Pure in 1997.

Background
Speaking to Songwriting Magazine in 2013, Waite said of the album: "When You Were Mine was the best album I ever did. I kind of went country in an English way, but it's a beautiful record." He told Classic Rock Revisited that year: "When You Were Mine has strong acoustic values, and tells stories. It was completely different to what I had done before."

Critical reception

Stephen Thomas Erlewine of AllMusic considered the album to "tone down [Waite's] hard rock influences in an attempt to regain the adult contemporary radio audience he once had". He concluded: "Although the results aren't entirely successful, there's enough well-crafted mainstream pop here to satisfy longtime fans."

Track listing

Personnel 
 John Waite – lead and backing vocals
 Chuck Kentis – Steinway grand piano, electric piano, Hammond organ, programming (10)
 Mindy Joysten – accordion, harmony vocals (5, 6, 11)
 Shane Fontayne – electric guitars, acoustic guitar, 6-string bass 
 Jeff Golub – electric guitars, acoustic guitar, 12-string acoustic guitar 
 Donnie Nossov – electric bass, acoustic bass
 Tony Beard – drums 
 Tommy Funderburk – backing vocals (1, 10)
 Mark Spiro – backing vocals (1, 10)
 Liz Constantine – harmony vocals (8)

Production 
 John Waite – producer 
 Tony Phillips – engineer, mixing 
 Chad Bamford – assistant engineer 
 Milton Chan – assistant engineer 
 Peter Kepler – assistant engineer 
 Tom Schick – assistant engineer 
 Ken Villeneuve – assistant engineer 
 Dave Collins – mastering 
 Andrew Garver – mastering assistant 
 Mick Rock – photography

References

1997 albums
John Waite albums
Mercury Records albums